ISIM or iSIM may refer to:

 International Society for Invertebrate Morphology
 Institute for the Study of International Migration
 IP Multimedia Services Identity Module
 Integrated Science Instrument Module
 iSIM (subscriber identity module), a type of SIM directly integrated into a device's chipset

See also
: